Boufarik is a town in Blida Province, Algeria, approximately 30 km from Algiers. In 2008, its population was 57,162.

The major neighbourhoods of the city are: K'ssar, Blatan, Ben gladash, Mimoun, Trig erange, Bariyan.

The city is well known for the production of oranges.

The main stadium is the Boufarik Stadium (Stade du Boufarik).

Notable residents
Jean-Claude Beton, founder of Orangina.

See also

 Boufarik Airport
 Boufarik colonization monument

References

Communes of Blida Province
Algeria